John Hopkin Roberts (30 June 1918 – June 2001) was a Welsh professional footballer who made over 160 appearances in the Football League for Bolton Wanderers as a full back. He won one cap for Wales at international level.

Personal life 
Roberts served in 53rd (Bolton) Field Regiment, Royal Artillery, during the Second World War. He was injured in the eye by shrapnel in Italy and was evacuated back to Britain.

References

1918 births
2001 deaths
Welsh footballers
Wales international footballers
Bolton Wanderers F.C. players
Chelmsford City F.C. players
Swansea City A.F.C. players
Llanelli Town A.F.C. players
English Football League players
Association football fullbacks
British Army personnel of World War II
Royal Artillery personnel
Military personnel from Swansea